A cuff is the lower edge of a sleeve or pant leg.

Cuff may also refer to:

Objects
 Epimanikia, often called "cuffs", a liturgical vestment used in the Eastern Churches
 Cuff, an inflatable balloon that can hold a catheter in place
 Cuff, a slang term for handcuffs
 Cuff microscope, a form of microscope

Organizations
Canadian Unihockey/Floorball Federation
Cuffs (Iowa State University), an Iowa State University BDSM student group

Other uses
 Cuff (surname), a list of people with the surname
 City University Film Festival, or CUFF, at CUNY
 Cuff Cape, a headland in Victoria Land, Antarctica
 Cuffs (TV series), a 2015 police drama series set in Brighton, England
 Cuff, NATO reporting name for the Russian Beriev Be-30 airliner and transport aircraft

See also
 Rotator cuff, a group of muscles and their tendons that act to stabilize the shoulder
 Kuffs, a 1992 film starring Christian Slater and Milla Jovovich